Matías Galarza may refer to:

 Matías Galarza (Argentine footballer) (born 2002), Argentine football midfielder for Genk
 Matías Galarza (Paraguayan footballer) (born 2002), Paraguayan football midfielder for Coritiba